Omid Khouraj (born September 20, 1982) is an Iranian footballer who plays for Pas Hamedan F.C. in the IPL.

Club career statistics

Last Update: 3 August 2011 

 Assist Goals

Honours

Iran's Premier Football League Winner: 1
2003/04 with Pas Tehran

External links
Profile at Persianleague.com

1981 births
Living people
Pas players
PAS Hamedan F.C. players
Foolad FC players
Persian Gulf Pro League players
Iranian footballers
Association football defenders